Miguel Ángel García Domínguez (20 December 1931 – 27 June 2014) was a Mexican lawyer and politician affiliated with the Party of the Democratic Revolution. As of 2014 he served as Deputy of the LIX Legislature of the Mexican Congress representing the Federal District.

References

1931 births
2014 deaths
Politicians from Guanajuato
People from San Miguel de Allende
20th-century Mexican lawyers
National Autonomous University of Mexico alumni
Academic staff of the National Autonomous University of Mexico
Institutional Revolutionary Party politicians
Members of the Chamber of Deputies (Mexico) for Mexico City